The 3rd North-West Legislative Assembly was constituted after the 1894 North-West Territories general election which took place on October 31, 1984. It lasted from 1894 to 1898. Several important developments happened during this Assembly. The Northwest Territories was granted a Premier and a full Executive Council in 1897, and the Yukon was carved from the territory in 1898 due to the territorial government trying to collect taxes from settlers heading to the Klondike Gold Rush.

List of Members of the Legislative Assembly

References

Further reading 
 
 
 
 

003